Grant's worm snake or Guanica blindsnake (Antillotyphlops granti) is a species of snake in the family Typhlopidae. The species is endemic to Puerto Rico.

Etymology
The specific name, granti, is in honor of American herpetologist Chapman Grant.

Geographic range

References

Further reading
Ruthven AG, Gaige HT (1935). "Observations on Typhlops from Puerto Rico and some of the adjacent islands". Occ. Pap. Mus. Zool. Univ. Michigan 307: 1–12. (Typhlops granti, new species, pp. 2–4, Figure 1).

granti
Snakes of North America
Reptiles of Puerto Rico
Endemic fauna of Puerto Rico
Reptiles described in 1935
Taxa named by Helen Beulah Thompson Gaige
Taxa named by Alexander Grant Ruthven